Feynman parametrization is a technique for evaluating loop integrals which arise from Feynman diagrams with one or more loops. However, it is sometimes useful in integration in areas of pure mathematics as well.

Formulas 
Richard Feynman observed that:

which is valid for any complex numbers A and B as long as 0 is not contained in the line segment connecting A and B. The formula helps to evaluate integrals like:

If A(p) and B(p) are linear functions of p, then the last integral can be evaluated using substitution.

More generally, using the Dirac delta function :

This formula is valid for any complex numbers A1,...,An as long as 0 is not contained in their convex hull.

Even more generally, provided that  for all :

 
where the Gamma function  was used.

Derivation

By using the substitution ,

from which we get the desired result

In more general cases, derivations can be done very efficiently using the Schwinger parametrization.

and rewrite,

Then we perform the following change of integration variables,

to obtain,

The next step is to perform the  integration.

  
where we have defined 

Substituting this result, we get to the penultimate form,

and, after introducing an extra integral, we arrive at the final form of the Feynman parametrization, namely,

Similarly, in order to derive the Feynman parametrization form of the most general case, one could begin with the suitable different Schwinger parametrization form of factors in the denominator, namely,
 

and then proceed exactly along the lines of previous case.

Alternative form
An alternative form of the parametrization that is sometimes useful is

This form can be derived using the change of variables .
We can use the product rule to show that , then

More generally we have

where  is the gamma function.

This form can be useful when combining a linear denominator  with a quadratic denominator , such as in heavy quark effective theory (HQET).

Symmetric form
A symmetric form of the parametrization is occasionally used, where the integral is instead performed on the interval , leading to:

References

Quantum field theory
Richard Feynman